Giovanni di Stefano (fl. 1366 – 1391) — was an Italian architect who designed the tabernacle at the Basilica of St. John Lateran in 1367.

References

14th-century Italian architects
Architects from Lazio